Sarabhai is a surname, and may refer to:

 Ambalal Sarabhai (1890–1967), Indian industrialist
 Anasuya Sarabhai (1885–1972), pioneer of the women's labour movement in India
 Gautam Sarabhai (1917–1995), industrialist and businessman
 Gira Sarabhai (1923–2021), Indian architect and designer
 Gita Sarabhai (1922–2011), Indian musician
 Kamalini Sarabhai (1925–1981), clinician and psychoanalyst
 Kartikeya Sarabhai, grandson of industrialist Ambalal Sarabhai
 Mallika Sarabhai (born 1954), activist and Indian classical dancer and actress
 Mridula Sarabhai (1911–1974), Indian independence activist and politician
 Mrinalini Sarabhai (1918–2016), Indian classical dancer
 Revanta Sarabhai (born 1984), Indian actor and dancer
 Shagun Sarabhai (born 1987), Indian beauty queen
 Vikram Sarabhai (1919–1971), Indian physicist and astronomer

See also
 Sarabhai family
 Sarabhai vs Sarabhai, an Indian sitcom